The 1898 Tuapeka by-election was a by-election held on 2 November 1898 during the 13th New Zealand Parliament in the rural lower South Island electorate of .

The by-election was held to replace William Larnach after his death by suicide in Parliament during the 13th Parliament.

The winner was Charles Rawlins, described as opposed to the Liberal Government and with only Henry Symes as a government candidate or supporter with "ministerial inclinations" and Charles Rawlings as "opposition".

James Sim a farmer of Tapanui had been prepared to stand in the Liberal interest until his health broke down (or from lack of impression that he made and support?).

Results
The following table gives the election result:

Notes

Tuapeka 1898
1898 elections in New Zealand
Politics of Otago